David Sax (born 1979) is a Canadian journalist. Born in Toronto, Ontario, Sax has written for publications such as New York Magazine, Vanity Fair, Bloomberg Business Week, The New York Times, Saveur, NPR, GQ and Toronto Life.

Books 
Sax is the author of several books, including The Revenge of Analog, which was named one of Michiko Kakutani's Best Books of 2016 in the New York Times, The Tastemakers, and  Save the Deli, a book that examines the recent decline of the Jewish Delicatessen and puts forward a case for saving it. His book, The Soul of an Entrepreneur, was published by PublicAffairs in April 2020.

Awards and honors
Sax's book "Save the Deli" won the James Beard award.

References

External links
 David Sax profile at Cookbook Recipe Database
 'Save the Deli'
 David Sax: Save the Deli on Fora.tv
 David Sax audio interview about Save the Deli
Interview on The Next Track podcast about The Revenge of Analog

1979 births
Journalists from Toronto
Living people
Writers from Toronto
Jewish Canadian journalists